The Buckner site (15BB12) is a Middle Fort Ancient culture (1200 to 1400 CE) archaeological site located in Bourbon County, Kentucky on Strodes Creek. It has two large circular village areas, each surrounding its own central plaza and several smaller special use areas to the north and northeast of the site. The site was excavated during the 1930s by William S. Webb as salvage archaeology operations during the Great Depression. It was added to the National Register of Historic Places on January 27, 1983.

References

Fort Ancient culture
National Register of Historic Places in Bourbon County, Kentucky
Archaeological sites on the National Register of Historic Places in Kentucky
Former populated places in Kentucky